Areguá is the capital of Central Department in Paraguay, located  from the capital, Asunción. The city lies between Ypacaraí Lake to the east and hills to the west. Areguá is known for its colonial architecture and historic cobblestone streets. Areguá is known as the "City of Strawberries" due to its strawberry farms.

Toponymy

Areguá takes its name from its indigenous inhabitants, the Mbyá Guaraní, who inhabited the area before Spanish colonization. The local group were the Areguá ("those from above") referring to the area's high altitude.

History
Areguá was founded by Domingo Martínez de Irala in 1538. Early settlers, numbering about 200, lived close to the church. They were Mercedarians who arrived with the Spanish to raise cattle. African slaves were put to work on these farms.

By the end of the 19th century, Areguá had become a tourist destination to which many writers, artists and intellectuals from nearby areas retreated in the summer.

Climate
Areguá's climate is temperate. Maximum summer temperatures reach 40 °C. Average winter temperatures are 0 °C. The average annual rainfall is 1377 mm distributed throughout the year.

Demography
Areguá's population is about 67,847. Of these residents, 33,870 are female and 33,977 are male.

Economy
Areguá's economy is based on strawberry farming. The town is also known for its pottery, which is an emergent industry in the region.

Places of interest
Areguá has an historic area centred on Avenida del Lago (Lake Avenue) which runs from a hilltop church to the Ypacaraí Lake. In 1997, the Paraguayan parliament declared it a "National Heritage Area".

"Isla Valle", the local ecological organization, regulates fishing in the lake.

Another attraction is the Centro Artesanal de la Cuenca.  At the Center, craftsmen from the region display locally made pottery and crafts. Aregua also has art galleries, including Guggiari Arte, Luis Cogliolo Galería de Arte, Paseo La Candelaria, Areguá pesebres, El Cántaro, and Museo las Margaritas.

The Koi and Chorori hills are a geologic attraction. Koi Hill is known for its formations of hexagonal sandstone. The formations are a protected heritage site and the hill was declared a "Natural Monumente" in 1993.

Famous people
The Paraguayan writer Gabriel Casaccia was born in Areguá.

See also
 Geografía del Paraguay - Editorial Hispana Paraguay S.R.L.- 1a. Edición 1999 - Asunción Paraguay
 Geografía Ilustrada del Paraguay -  - Distribuidora Arami S.R.L.
 La Magia de nuestra tierra. Fundación en Alianza. Asunción. 2007.

References

External links

 
  SENATUR

Populated places in the Central Department